Eremaea atala is a plant in the myrtle family, Myrtaceae and is endemic to the south-west of Western Australia. It is a small shrub with small, soft, non-prickly leaves, and purple flowers in late spring or summer. Flowers appear in groups of up to five usually on the ends of branches formed in the same year's growth.

Description
Unlike some others in the genus Eremaea, the leaves are soft and lack a prickly end.

The flowers are purple-coloured and arranged in groups of mostly three in the angles of the leaves, mostly along the current year's growth. The stamens, which give the flower its colour, are arranged in 5 bundles, each containing 19 to 20 stamens. Flowering occurs from November to January and is followed by fruits which are woody capsules.

Taxonomy and naming
Eremaea atala was first formally described in 1993 by Roger Hnatiuk in Nuytsia. The specific epithet (atala) is from the Ancient Greek atalos meaning "soft" or "delicate" referring to the soft leaves of this species compared to those of the closely related Eremaea violacea and Eremaea hadra.

Distribution and habitat
Eremaea atala is found between the Arrowsmith and Hill Rivers in the Geraldton Sandplains and Swan Coastal Plain biogeographic regions. It grows in sand over laterite.

Conservation
Eremaea atala is classified as "not threatened" by the Western Australian Government Department of Parks and Wildlife.

References

atala
Myrtales of Australia
Plants described in 1993
Endemic flora of Western Australia